Jai Quehaeni is an Indian actress and dancer who works in Tamil language films.

Career 
Jai Quehaeni is a trained bharatanatyam dancer, and regularly performs in dance troupes across India.

She made her film debut with  Aarohanam (2012) before starring Meiyyazhagi (2013) with Balaji Balakrishnan. In a review of the latter, a critic noted that "Jai Quehaeni, who, in the titular role, manages to hold the story together."

She later starred in Charles Shafiq Karthiga (2015) and the thriller Maiem (2015). She signed a horror thriller Iravil in 2016; however the film remains unreleased.

Personal life
Jai Quehaeni married software engineer Prabakaran Sengiah (elder brother of Pradeepan Sengiah) in January 2020.

Filmography 
All films are in Tamil.

References

External links 
 

Living people
Year of birth missing (living people)
21st-century Indian actresses
Actresses from Chennai
Actresses in Tamil cinema
Indian film actresses